The term Quran code (also known as Code 19) refers to the claim that the Quranic text contains a hidden mathematically complex code. Advocates think that the code represents a mathematical proof of the divine authorship of the Quran and that it can be used to identify orthographic errors within the Quranic text. Proponents of the Quran code claim that the code is based on statistical procedures similar to that of the Bible code, which is ostensibly based on steganography. However, this claim has not been validated by any independent mathematical or scientific institute.

History 
In 1969, Rashad Khalifa, an Egyptian-American biochemist, began analyzing the separated letters of the Quran (also called Quranic initials or Muqattaʿat), and the Quran to examine certain sequences of numbers. In 1973 he published the book Miracle of the Quran: Significance of the Mysterious Alphabets, in which he describes the Quranic initials through enumerations and distributions.

In 1974, Khalifa claimed to have discovered a mathematical code hidden in the Quran, a code based around the number 19. He wrote the book The Computer Speaks: God's Message to the World, in which he thematizes this Quran code. He relies on Surah 74, verse 30 to prove the significance of the number: "Over it is nineteen,".

Proponents of the code include United Submitters International (an association initiated by Rashad Khalifa) as well as some Quranists and traditional Muslims.

Example 
Believers in Quran Code often use certain word counts, checksums and cross sums to legitimize the code.

Edip Yüksel, a Turkish Quranistic author and colleague of Rashad Khalifa, makes the following claims in his book Nineteen: God's Signature in Nature and Scripture:
 The Basmala (bismi ʾllāhi ʾr-raḥmāni ʾr-raḥīmi), the Quranic opening formula, which, with one exception, is at the beginning of every Surah of the Quran, consists of exactly 19 letters.
The first word of the Basmala, Ism (name), without contraction, occurs 19 times in the Quran (19×1). [Also no plural forms, or those with pronoun endings]
The second word of the Basmala, Allah (God), occurs 2698 times (19×142).
The third word of the Basmala, Rahman (Gracious), occurs 57 times (19×3).
The fourth word of the Basmala, Rahim (Merciful), occurs 114 times (19×6).
The multiplication factors of the words of the Basmala (1+142+3+6) give 152 (19×8).
The Quran consists of 114 chapters (19×6).
The total number of verses in the Quran including all unnumbered Basmalas is 6346 (19×334). The cross sum of 6346 is 19.
The Basmala appears 114 times (despite its absence in chapter 9, it appears twice in chapter 27); 114 is 19×6.
From the missing Basmala in chapter 9 to the additional Basmala in chapter 27, there are exactly 19 chapters.
The occurrence of the additional Basmala is in Surah 27:30. Adding this chapter number and the verse number gives 57 (19×3).

The separated letters in the Quran 
The Quran consists of 114 Surahs, of which a total of 29 Surahs are provided with separated letters, Muqattaʿat or also called Quranic initials. These are listed in the following table:

Rashad Khalifa wrote in his book, The Computer Speaks: God's Message to the World, that the separated letters of the Quran, or Quranic Initials, held the key to the Quran Code. By analyzing the Quran's 29 initialized Surahs statistically, Khalifa claimed to reveal complex mathematical patterns centered around the number 19.

Quranic Gematria 
Each Arabic letter can be assigned a specific numerical value, also called gematria:

Abdullah Arik, a Quranistic author, uses this method in his book Beyond Probability: God's Message in Mathematics to analyze the Basmala gematrically. He gives various numerological arguments relying on these values to bolster his arguments.

Reception in the Western world 
Khalifa's research received little attention in the Western world. In 1980, Martin Gardner mentioned Khalifa's work in Scientific American. In 1997, after Khalifa's death, Gardner devoted a short article to the subject while a columnist for the Skeptical Inquirer.

Criticism 
Common critiques of numerological claims also apply to the Quran Code. Critics often invoke the concept of Stochastic processes to explain how seemingly mystical patterns could appear in any large dataset. One such critic was Bilal Philips, who argued that Rashad Khalifa's "miracle 19" theory was a hoax based on falsified data, misinterpretations of the Quran's text, and grammar inconsistencies.

Additionally, since early Quran manuscripts can contain orthographic differences in certain passages, the precise number of letters in those sections can be unclear. For example, since the frequency of the letter Alif is subject to debate, there is not an universally agreed letter count in the Alif initialized Surahs. However, to prove his theory Khalifa chose those versions of the text that included letter frequencies divisible by 19. Additionally, Khalifa claimed that the initial "Nūn" in Surah 68 should be spelled as to include an additional Nūn: "Nūn Wāw Nūn" in place of the orthodox spelling, "Nūn". This allowed Khalifa to claim that there are 133 (19×7) Nūns in Surah 68, instead of 132, which is not a multiple of 19. However, Khalifa's spelling does not appear in any Quranic manuscripts. He also assumed that the correct spelling or reading of the word "basṭatan", which occurs in Surah 7, verse 69, contains the Arabic letter Sīn instead of the letter Sād, which is the conventional spelling. He based this assertion on the Samarkand Codex, an 9th century Quranic manuscript which includes a spelling with the letter Sīn in place of Sād.

Khalifa  also claimed that two verses in the Quran, specifically Surah 9, verses 128 and 129, were humanly added, and should not be included. He supports this claim by the hadith Sahīh al-Buchārī 7425, according to which Zaid ibn Thābitm, tasked by Abu Bakr with compiling the Quran, found only one witness to attest to the validity of verses 9:128–129, Chuzaima al-Ansari. Thus, Khalifa claimed that the Quran has only 6346 verses instead of the traditional count of 6348. The omission of these verses is integral to his theory; if these two verses are taken into account, there are 2699 occurrences of the word "Allah" and 115 occurrences of the word "Rahim", neither of which are multiples of 19.

Furthermore, the version of the Quran code is questioned, as it is only used for certain aspects or Quranic initials. Surahs that are not initiated are not fully examined in this context. Since early Quran manuscripts differ orthographically in certain passages, it makes it difficult to reconstruct an "urtext" – or in another expression a "primordial text" – for the Quran, which in turn is used for letter enumerations as well as gematria.

References

Bibliography

See also 
 Bible code

External links 

 Various hypothetical mathematical considerations regarding the Quran code
 Video presentation of certain aspects of Code 19
 "171 examples of the mathematical System"

Code
Quranism
Numerology